Orit is a Hebrew language feminine given name. 
Notable people with this given name include:
Orit Gadiesh
Orit Noked
Orit Strook
Orit Wolf
Orit Adato
Orit Rozin
Orit Bar-On
Orit Ishay
Orit Zuaretz
Orit Galili-Zucker

Other uses
 The Beta Israel name for the Octateuch, which is the set of scriptures used in Ethiopian Jewish synagogues - the Orit comprises the Torah plus the Book of Joshua, the Book of Judges, and the Book of Ruth

Hebrew feminine given names